Oliver Rackham  (17 October 1939 – 12 February 2015) was an academic at the University of Cambridge who studied the ecology, management and development of the British countryside, especially trees, woodlands and wood pasture. His books included Ancient Woodland (1980) and The History of the Countryside (1986).

Life and academic career
Rackham was born in Bungay and attended King Edward VI School, and then Norwich City College. In 1958 he won a scholarship to Corpus Christi College, Cambridge, graduating in Natural Sciences in 1961 and subsequently gaining a PhD.[firewall] He began his academic career studying physics, but moved between several Cambridge departments. He conducted research in the Department of Botany from 1964 to 1968 and 1972 to 1990, and the Plant Breeding Institute of Cambridge from 1968 to 1972. He transferred to the Department of Geography from 1988 to 2000, latterly as Professor, and was appointed Honorary Professor of Historical ecology in the Department of Plant Sciences in 2006 and Honorary Director of the Cambridge Centre for Landscape and People in 2010.  Rackham also worked as a tutor in the Kingcombe Centre in Dorset, teaching about the history of woodlands.

He was associated with Corpus Christi College from his student days. He briefly served as Master of the College from 2007 to 2008, and was made a Life Fellow in 2010.

Contributions
Rackham was a prolific historical ecologist whose prime interest was the function, history, and management of British woodlands. He kept a series of notebooks, which he began during his youth and continued until his death, in which he recorded observations on plants seen in his home surroundings and on his travels, in addition to information about the weather and his college duties. Arising from his research on Hayley Wood in Cambridgeshire, he developed the concept of ancient woodland, rich in plant diversity and managed through traditional practices. His 1980 book Ancient Woodland, its History, Vegetation and Uses in England led to the recognition of such areas by the Forestry Commission and in planning legislation. It also helped to alter forestry industry views about woodland conservation. The Woodland Trust became a larger woodland owner to ensure conservation. He argued for the preservation of traditional management techniques like coppicing, to let light in to increase in the diversity of the herb layer.

In 1986 he published The History of the Countryside, regarded as his greatest achievement and described as "a magisterial 400-page account of the British landscape from prehistory to the present day, with chapters on aspects ranging from woodland and hedgerows to marshes and the sea."  The book won several awards for literature. His other books include Woodlands (2006), in the Collins New Naturalist series, and he also wrote on Hatfield Forest.

As well as working in England, he studied and published extensively on the ecology and landscape of Crete, co-writing The Making of the Cretan Landscape with Jenny Moody in 1998, and latterly leading a (failed) protest against the granting of planning permission for the Cavo Sidero golf and hotel project on the island's eastern tip. Corpus Christi College named one of their boats 'Rackham the Red' in his honour.

Personal life
Rackham was an only child, and was unmarried. He died on 12 February 2015 at the age of 75 after a short illness.

Awards
OBE for "services to Nature Conservation", 1998.
Fellow of the British Academy, 2002. 
Honorary Doctorate, University of Essex, 2000
 For The History of the Countryside: 1986 Angel Literary Award, the Sir Peter Kent Conservation Prize and the Natural World Book of the Year.

Selected works

References

External links
 Oliver Rackham's Notebooks digitised in Cambridge Digital Library

 
 

1939 births
2015 deaths
British botanists
Fellows of Corpus Christi College, Cambridge
Fellows of the British Academy
Landscape historians
Masters of Corpus Christi College, Cambridge
New Naturalist writers
Officers of the Order of the British Empire
People educated at Norwich School
People educated at City College Norwich
People from Bungay